Prospect Hill Academy Charter School (PHA) is a tuition-free, college preparatory charter public school serving grades PreK - 12 in Somerville, Massachusetts and Cambridge, Massachusetts. The school was founded in 1996.

PHA serves more than 1,100 students from diverse racial, ethnic, and economic backgrounds. 87% are people of color, nearly two-thirds are low-income, and approximately half come from homes where English is not the primary language spoken.

Since 2009, PHA has consistently placed in the top 7% of all U.S. high schools per U.S. News & World Report.

Campuses
Prospect Hill Academy is located on three campuses in Somerville, Massachusetts and Cambridge, Massachusetts:

 The Early Childhood Campus, serving grades PreK-3, is located at 15 Webster Avenue, Somerville, in Union Square (Somerville). 
 The Upper Elementary Campus, serving grades 4-6, is located at 17 Franklin Street, in East Somerville. 
 The Upper School Campus, serving grades 7-12, is located at 50-54 Essex Street, Cambridge, near Central Square (Cambridge). Grades 7-8 (Middle School Campus) is at 50 Essex and 9-12 (High School & Collegiate Institute Campus) is at 54 Essex.

Curriculum

Collegiate Institute Curriculum
As the name implies, Collegiate Institute students undertake a college preparatory curriculum.  English classes focus on American literature and identity in the 11th grade, then short stories, and the social contract in the 12th grade, with a required senior thesis. Prospect Hill's science offerings include physics.  Electives include AP English, AP Spanish Language, AP United States History, AP Biology, AP Calculus AB, AP Statistics, and Anatomy and Physiology.  Additional courses are offered in Spanish, Computer Science, and the Fine and Performing arts.

Extracurricular activities

Athletics
Prospect Hill Academy is a member of the Massachusetts Charter School Athletic Organization. Sports offerings include soccer, basketball, baseball, softball, volleyball, cheerleading, cross-country running, and track.

Clubs and publications
High School clubs have included the Art Club, Chess Club, EPICS, Gay Straight Alliance, Junior State of America, Knitting, Sign Language, Video Production, and the Yearbook as well as athletic clubs such as Dance club, Boys Fitness, and Girls Fitness. In the Fall of 2012 clubs included: Fundamentals of Art, Dance Club, 9th Grade Choir, HAIRitage, Hip Hop 101, Self Defense, Pumped Up Kicks, and Drum Line
Upper Elementary clubs include: the drama club, the Improv Olympics club, the newspaper club, the dance club, the ski and snowboard club, the flag football club, and the basketball club.

References

External links

About Massachusetts Charter Schools
U.S. News & World Report Ranking

Education in Cambridge, Massachusetts
Buildings and structures in Somerville, Massachusetts
Educational institutions established in 1996
Public middle schools in Massachusetts
Public elementary schools in Massachusetts
Charter K-12 schools in the United States
Buildings and structures in Cambridge, Massachusetts
Charter schools in Massachusetts
Schools in Middlesex County, Massachusetts
Public high schools in Massachusetts
1996 establishments in Massachusetts